The 38th Filmfare Awards were held in 1993.

Beta, Deewana and Khuda Gawah led the ceremony with 9 nominations each, followed by Jo Jeeta Wohi Sikandar with 8 nominations.

Jo Jeeta Wohi Sikandar won Best Film without winning any other major awards, while Beta and Deewana won 5 awards each, with the former winning Best Actor (for Anil Kapoor), Best Actress (for Madhuri Dixit) and Best Supporting Actress (for Aruna Irani), and the latter winning Best Male Debut (for Shah Rukh Khan) and Best Female Debut (for Divya Bharti). thus become the most-awarded films at the ceremony.

Main awards

Best Film
 Jo Jeeta Wohi Sikandar 
Beta
Khuda Gawah

Best Director
 Mukul Anand – Khuda Gawah 
Indra Kumar – Beta
Mansoor Khan – Jo Jeeta Wohi Sikandar

Best Actor
 Anil Kapoor – Beta 
Aamir Khan – Jo Jeeta Wohi Sikandar
Amitabh Bachchan – Khuda Gawah

Best Actress
 Madhuri Dixit – Beta 
Divya Bharti – Deewana
Juhi Chawla – Bol Radha Bol
Sridevi – Khuda Gawah

Best Supporting Actor
 Danny Denzongpa – Khuda Gawah 
Amrish Puri – Muskurahat
Nana Patekar – Raju Ban Gaya Gentleman

Best Supporting Actress
 Aruna Irani – Beta 
Pooja Bedi – Jo Jeeta Wohi Sikandar
Shilpa Shirodkar – Khuda Gawah

Best Comedian
 Anupam Kher – Khel 
Anupam Kher – Shola Aur Shabnam
Laxmikant Berde – Beta

Best Villain
 Nana Patekar – Angaar 
Amrish Puri – Tahalka
Kiran Kumar – Khuda Gawah

Best Debut
 Shah Rukh Khan – Deewana

Lux New Face of the Year
 Divya Bharti – Deewana

Best Screenplay
 Raju Ban Gaya Gentleman – Aziz Mirza and Manoj Lalwani

Best Dialogue
 Angaar – Kader Khan

Best Music Director 
 Deewana – Nadeem-Shravan 
Beta – Anand–Milind 
Jo Jeeta Wohi Sikandar – Jatin–Lalit

Best Lyricist
 Deewana – Sameer for Teri Umeed 
Deewana – Sameer for Aisi Deewangi
Jo Jeeta Wohi Sikandar – Majrooh Sultanpuri for Woh Sikandar Hi Doston

Best Playback Singer, Male
 Deewana – Kumar Sanu for Sochenge Tumhein 
Deewana – Vinod Rathod for Aisi Deewangi
Jo Jeeta Wohi Sikandar – Udit Narayan for Pehla Nasha

Best Playback Singer, Female
 Beta – Anuradha Paudwal for Dhak Dhak 
Deewana – Alka Yagnik for Aisi Deewangi
Khuda Gawah – Kavita Krishnamurthy for Main Tujhe Kabool

Best Action 
Khuda Gawah

Best Art Direction
 Angaar

Best Choreography
 Beta – Saroj Khan for Dhak Dhak Karne Laga

Best Cinematography
 Muskurahat

Best Editing
 Jo Jeeta Wohi Sikandar

Best Sound
 Khuda Gawah

Lifetime Achievement Award
 Dev Anand

Critics' awards

Best Film
 Idiot

Best Actress
 Dimple Kapadia – Rudaali

Best Documentary
 All in the Family

Biggest Winners
Beta – 5/9
Deewana – 5/9
Khuda Gawah – 4/9
Angaar – 3/3
Jo Jeeta Wohi Sikandar – 2/8

See also
 39th Filmfare Awards
 40th Filmfare Awards
 Filmfare Awards

References
https://www.imdb.com/event/ev0000245/1993/

Filmfare Awards
Filmfare